An academic discipline or field of study is a branch of knowledge, taught and researched as part of higher education. A scholar's discipline is commonly defined by the university faculties and learned societies to which they belong and the academic journals in which they publish research.

Disciplines vary between well-established ones that exist in almost all universities and have well-defined rosters of journals and conferences, and nascent ones supported by only a few universities and publications. A discipline may have branches, and these are often called sub-disciplines.

The following outline is provided as an overview of and topical guide to academic disciplines. In each case an entry at the highest level of the hierarchy (e.g., Humanities) is a group of broadly similar disciplines; an entry at the next highest level (e.g., Music) is a discipline having some degree of autonomy and being the basic identity felt by its scholars; and lower levels of the hierarchy are sub-disciplines not normally having any role in the structure of the university's governance.

Humanities

Performing arts 

 Music (outline)
 Accompanying
 Chamber music
 Church music
 Conducting
 Choral conducting
 Orchestral conducting
 Wind ensemble conducting
 Early music
 Jazz studies (outline)
 Musical composition
 Music education
 Music history
 Musicology
 Historical musicology
 Systematic musicology
 Ethnomusicology
 Music theory
 Orchestral studies
 Organology
 Organ and historical keyboards
 Piano
 Strings, harp, oud, and guitar (outline)
 Singing
 Woodwinds, brass, and percussion
 Recording
 Dance (outline)
 Choreography
 Dance notation
 Ethnochoreology
 History of dance
 Television (outline)
 Television studies
 Theatre (outline)
 Acting
 Directing
 Dramaturgy
 History of theatre
 Musical theatre
 Playwrighting
 Puppetry
 Scenography
 Stage design
 Ventriloquism
 Film (outline)
 Animation
 Film criticism
 Filmmaking
 Film theory
 Live action

Visual arts 

 Applied arts
 Animation
 Art Director
 Calligraphy
 Decorative arts
 Digital art
 Mixed media
 Printmaking
 Studio art
 Graphic design
 Architecture (Outline of architecture)
 Interior architecture
 Landscape architecture
 Landscape design
 Landscape planning
 Architectural analytics
 Historic preservation
 Interior design (interior architecture)
 Technical drawing
 Fashion
 Fine arts
 Graphic arts
 Drawing (outline)
 Painting (outline)
 Photography (outline)
 Sculpture (outline)

History 

 African history
 American history
 Ancient history
 Ancient Egypt
 Carthage
 Ancient Greek history (outline)
 Ancient Roman history (outline)
Assyrian Civilization
Bronze Age Civilizations
 Biblical history
 History of the Indus Valley Civilization
 Preclassic Maya
 History of Mesopotamia
 The Stone Age
 History of the Yangtze civilization
 History of the Yellow River civilization
 Asian history
 Chinese history
 Indian history (outline)
 Indonesian history
 Iranian history
 Australian history
 Cultural history
 Ecclesiastical history of the Catholic Church
 Economic history
 Environmental history
 European history
 Intellectual history
 Jewish history
 Latin American history
 Modern history
 Philosophical history
 Ancient philosophy
 Contemporary philosophy
 Medieval philosophy
 Humanism (outline)
 Scholasticism
 Modern philosophy
 Political history
 History of political thought
 Pre-Columbian era history
Prehistory
 Public history
 Russian history
 Scientific history
 Technological history
 World history

Languages and literature 

 Linguistics (Outline of linguistics)
 Applied linguistics
 Composition studies
 Computational linguistics
 Discourse analysis
 English studies
 Etymology
 Grammar
 Grammatology
 Historical linguistics
 History of linguistics
 Interlinguistics
 Lexicology
 Linguistic typology
 Morphology (linguistics)
 Natural language processing
 Philology
 Phonetics
 Phonology
 Pragmatics
 Psycholinguistics
 Rhetoric
 Semantics
 Semiotics (outline)
 Sociolinguistics
 Syntax
 Usage
 Word usage
 Comics studies
 Comparative literature
 Creative writing
 English literature
 History of literature
 Ancient literature
 Medieval literature
 Post-colonial literature
 Post-modern literature
 Literary theory
 Critical theory (outline)
 Literary criticism
 Poetics
 Poetry
 Prose
 Fiction (outline)
 Non-fiction
 World literature
 African-American literature
 American literature
 British literature

Law 

 Administrative law
 Canon law
 Civil law
 Admiralty law
 Animal law/Animal rights
 Civil procedure
 Common law
 Contract law
 Corporations
 Environmental law
 Family law
 Federal law
 International law
 Public international law
 Supranational law
 Labor law
 Property law
 Tax law
 Tort law (outline)
 Comparative law
 Competition law
 Constitutional law
 Criminal law
 Criminal justice (outline)
 Criminal procedure
 Forensic science (outline)
 Police science
 Islamic law
 Jewish law (outline)
 Jurisprudence (Philosophy of Law)
 Legal management (academic discipline)
 Commercial law
 Corporate law
 Procedural law
 Substantive law

Philosophy 

 Aesthetics (outline)
 Applied philosophy
 Philosophy of economics
 Philosophy of education
 Philosophy of engineering
 Philosophy of history
 Philosophy of language
 Philosophy of law
 Philosophy of mathematics
 Philosophy of music
 Philosophy of psychology
 Philosophy of religion
 Philosophy of physical sciences
 Philosophy of biology
 Philosophy of chemistry
 Philosophy of physics
 Philosophy of social science
 Philosophy of technology
 Systems philosophy
 Epistemology (outline)
 Justification
 Reasoning errors
 Ethics (outline)
 Applied ethics
 Animal rights
 Bioethics
 Environmental ethics
 Meta-ethics
 Moral psychology, Descriptive ethics, Value theory
 Normative ethics
 Virtue ethics
 Logic (outline)
 Mathematical logic
 Philosophical logic
 Meta-philosophy
 Metaphysics (outline)
 Philosophy of Action
 Determinism and Free will
 Ontology
 Philosophy of mind
 Philosophy of pain
 Philosophy of artificial intelligence
 Philosophy of perception
 Philosophy of space and time
 Teleology
 Theism and Atheism
 Philosophical traditions and schools
 African philosophy
 Analytic philosophy
 Aristotelianism
 Continental philosophy
 Eastern philosophy
 Feminist philosophy
 Platonism
 Social philosophy and political philosophy
 Anarchism (outline)
 Feminist philosophy
 Libertarianism (outline)
 Marxism

Religious Studies 

 History of Religion
 Anthropology of Religion
 Sociology of Religion
 Psychology of Religion
 Phenomenology of Religion

Theology 

 Biblical studies
 Biblical Hebrew, Koine Greek, Aramaic
 Buddhist theology
 Pali Studies
 Christian theology
 Anglican theology
 Baptist theology
 Catholic theology
 Eastern Orthodox theology
 Protestant theology
 Hindu theology
 Sanskrit Studies
Dravidian Studies
 Jewish theology
 Muslim theology
 Arabic Studies

Social science

Anthropology 

 Biological anthropology
 Linguistic anthropology
 Cultural anthropology
 Social anthropology
 Palaeoanthropology

Archaeology 

 Biocultural anthropology
 Evolutionary anthropology
 Feminist archaeology
 Forensic anthropology
 Maritime archaeology

Economics 

 Agricultural economics
 Anarchist economics
 Applied economics
 Behavioural economics
 Bioeconomics
 Complexity economics
 Computational economics
 Consumer economics
 Development economics
 Ecological economics
 Econometrics
 Economic geography
 Economic sociology
 Economic systems
 Education economics
 Energy economics
 Entrepreneurial economics
 Environmental economics
 Evolutionary economics
 Experimental economics
 Feminist economics
 Financial econometrics
 Financial economics
 Green economics
 Growth economics
 Human development theory
 Industrial organization
 Information economics
 Institutional economics
 International economics
 Islamic economics
 Labor economics
 Health economics
 Law and economics
 Macroeconomics
 Managerial economics
 Marxian economics
 Mathematical economics
 Microeconomics
 Monetary economics
 Neuroeconomics
 Participatory economics
 Political economy
 Public economics
 Public finance
 Real estate economics
 Resource economics
 Social choice theory
 Socialist economics
 Socioeconomics
 Transport economics
 Welfare economics

Geography 

 Physical geography
 Atmology
 Biogeography
 Climatology
 Coastal geography
 Emergency management
 Environmental geography
 Geobiology
 Geochemistry
 Geology
 Geomatics
 Geomorphology
 Geophysics
 Glaciology
 Hydrology
 Landscape ecology
 Lithology
 Meteorology
 Mineralogy
 Oceanography
 Palaeogeography
 Palaeontology
 Petrology
 Quaternary science
 Soil geography
 Human geography
 Behavioural geography
 Cognitive geography
 Cultural geography
 Development geography
 Economic geography
 Health geography
 Historical geography
 Language geography
 Mathematical geography
 Marketing geography
 Military geography
 Political geography
 Population geography
 Religion geography
 Social geography
 Strategic geography
 Time geography
 Tourism geography
 Transport geography
 Urban geography
 Integrated geography
 Cartography
 Celestial cartography
 Planetary cartography
 Topography

Political science 

 American politics
 Canadian politics
 Civics
 Comparative politics
 European studies
 Geopolitics (Political geography)
 International relations
 International organizations
 Nationalism studies
 Peace and conflict studies
 Policy studies
 Political behavior
 Political culture
 Political economy
 Political history
 Political philosophy
 Public administration
 Public law
 Psephology
 Social choice theory
 Singapore politics

Psychology 

 Abnormal psychology
 Applied psychology
 Biological psychology
 Clinical neuropsychology
 Clinical psychology
 Cognitive psychology
 Community psychology
 Comparative psychology
 Conservation psychology
 Consumer psychology
 Counseling psychology
 Criminal psychology
 Cultural psychology
 Asian psychology
 Black psychology
 Developmental psychology
 Differential psychology
 Ecological psychology
 Educational psychology
 Environmental psychology
 Evolutionary psychology
 Experimental psychology
 Group psychology
 Family psychology
 Feminine psychology
 Forensic developmental psychology
 Forensic psychology
 Health psychology
 Humanistic psychology
 Indigenous psychology
 Legal psychology
 Mathematical psychology
 Media psychology
 Medical psychology
 Military psychology
 Moral psychology and Descriptive ethics
 Music psychology
 Neuropsychology
 Occupational health psychology
 Occupational psychology
 Organizational psychology (a.k.a., Industrial Psychology)
 Parapsychology (outline)
 Pediatric psychology
 Pedology (children study)
 Personality psychology
 Phenomenology
 Political psychology
 Positive psychology
 Psychoanalysis
 Psychobiology
 Psychology of religion
 Psychometrics
 Psychopathology
 Child psychopathology
 Psychophysics
 Quantitative psychology
 Rehabilitation psychology
 School psychology
 Social psychology
 Sport psychology
 Traffic psychology
 Transpersonal psychology

Sociology 

 Analytical sociology
 Applied sociology
 Leisure studies
 Political sociology
 Public sociology
 Social engineering
 Architectural sociology
 Area studies
 African studies
 American studies
 Appalachian studies
 Canadian studies
 Latin American studies
 Asian studies
 Central Asian studies
 East Asian studies
 Iranian studies
 Japanese studies
 Korean studies
 Sinology (outline)
 South Asian studies
 Bengal studies
 Dravidology
 Pakistan studies
 Sindhology
 Southeast Asian studies
 Thai studies
 Australian studies
 European studies
 Celtic studies
 German studies
 Sociology in Poland
 Scandinavian studies
 Slavic studies
 Middle Eastern studies
 Arab studies
 Assyriology
 Egyptology
 Jewish studies
 Behavioral sociology
 Collective behavior
 Social movements
 Community informatics
 Social network analysis
 Comparative sociology
 Conflict theory
 Criminology/Criminal justice (outline)
 Critical management studies
 Critical sociology
 Cultural sociology
 Cultural studies/ethnic studies
 Africana studies
 Cross-cultural studies
 Culturology
 Deaf studies
 Ethnology
 Utopian studies
 Whiteness studies
 Demography/Population
 Digital sociology
 Dramaturgical sociology
 Economic sociology
 Educational sociology
 Empirical sociology
 Environmental sociology
 Evolutionary sociology
 Feminist sociology
 Figurational sociology
 Futures studies (outline)
 Gender studies
 Men's studies
 Women's studies
 Historical sociology
 Human ecology
 Humanistic sociology
 Industrial sociology
 Interactionism
 Interpretive sociology
 Ethnomethodology
 Phenomenology
 Social constructionism
 Symbolic interactionism
 Jealousy sociology
 Macrosociology
 Marxist sociology
 Mathematical sociology
 Medical sociology
 Mesosociology
 Microsociology
 Military sociology
 Natural resource sociology
 Organizational studies
 Phenomenological sociology
 Policy sociology
 Psychoanalytic sociology
 Science studies/Science and technology studies
 Sexology
 Heterosexism
 Human sexual behavior
 Human sexuality (outline)
 Queer studies/Queer theory
 Sex education
 Social capital
 Social change
 Social conflict theory
 Social control
 Pure sociology
 Social economy
 Social philosophy
 Social policy
 Social psychology
 Social stratification
 Social theory
 Social transformation
 Computational sociology
 Economic sociology/Socioeconomics
 Economic development
 Social development
 Sociobiology
 Sociocybernetics
 Sociolinguistics
 Sociology of aging
 Sociology of agriculture
 Sociology of art
 Sociology of autism
 Sociology of childhood
 Sociology of conflict
 Sociology of culture
 Sociology of cyberspace
 Sociology of development
 Sociology of deviance
 Sociology of disaster
 Sociology of education
 Sociology of emotions
 Sociology of fatherhood
 Sociology of finance
 Sociology of food
 Sociology of gender
 Sociology of generations
 Sociology of globalization
 Sociology of government
 Sociology of health and illness
 Sociology of human consciousness
 Sociology of immigration
 Sociology of knowledge
 Sociology of language
 Sociology of law
 Sociology of leisure
 Sociology of literature
 Sociology of markets
 Sociology of marriage
 Sociology of motherhood
 Sociology of music
 Sociology of natural resources
 Sociology of organizations
 Sociology of peace, war, and social conflict
 Sociology of punishment
 Sociology of race and ethnic relations
 Sociology of religion
 Sociology of risk
 Sociology of science
 Sociology of scientific knowledge
 Sociology of social change
 Sociology of social movements
 Sociology of space
 Sociology of sport
 Sociology of technology
 Sociology of terrorism
 Sociology of the body
 Sociology of the family
 Sociology of the history of science
 Sociology of the Internet
 Sociology of work
 Sociomusicology
 Structural sociology
 Theoretical sociology
 Urban studies or Urban sociology/Rural sociology
 Victimology
 Visual sociology

Social work 
 Clinical social work
 Community practice
 Mental health
 Psychosocial rehabilitation
 Person-centered therapy
 Family therapy
 Financial social work

Natural science

Biology 

 Aerobiology
 Anatomy
 Comparative anatomy
 Human anatomy (outline)
 Biochemistry (outline)
 Bioinformatics
 Biophysics (outline)
 Biotechnology (outline)
 Botany (outline)
 Ethnobotany
 Phycology
 Cell biology (outline)
 Chronobiology
 Computational biology
 Cryobiology
 Developmental biology
 Embryology
 Teratology
 Ecology (outline)
 Agroecology
 Ethnoecology
 Human ecology
 Landscape ecology
 Endocrinology
 Epigenetics
 Ethnobiology
 Anthrozoology
 Evolutionary biology
 Genetics (outline)
 Behavioural genetics
 Molecular genetics
 Population genetics
 Histology
 Human biology
 Immunology (outline)
 Limnology
 Linnaean taxonomy
 Marine biology
 Mathematical biology
 Microbiology
 Bacteriology
 Protistology
 Molecular biology
 Mycology
 Neuroscience (outline)
 Behavioral neuroscience
 Nutrition (outline)
 Paleobiology
 Paleontology
 Parasitology
 Pathology
 Anatomical pathology
 Clinical pathology
 Dermatopathology
 Forensic pathology
 Hematopathology
 Histopathology
 Molecular pathology
 Surgical pathology
 Physiology
 Human physiology
 Exercise physiology
 Structural Biology
 Systematics (Taxonomy)
 Systems biology
 Virology
 Molecular virology
 Xenobiology
 Zoology (outline)
 Animal communications
 Apiology
 Arachnology
 Arthropodology
 Batrachology
 Bryozoology
 Carcinology
 Cetology
 Cnidariology
 Entomology
 Forensic entomology
 Ethnozoology
 Ethology
 Helminthology
 Herpetology
 Ichthyology (outline)
 Invertebrate zoology
 Mammalogy
 Cynology
 Felinology
 Malacology
 Conchology
 Limacology
 Teuthology
 Myriapodology
 Myrmecology (outline)
 Nematology
 Neuroethology
 Oology
 Ornithology (outline)
 Planktology
 Primatology
 Zootomy
 Zoosemiotics

Chemistry 

 Agrochemistry
 Analytical chemistry
 Astrochemistry
 Atmospheric chemistry
 Biochemistry (outline)
 Chemical biology
 Chemical engineering (outline)
 Cheminformatics
 Computational chemistry
 Cosmochemistry
 Electrochemistry
 Environmental chemistry
 Femtochemistry
 Flavor
 Flow chemistry
 Geochemistry
 Green chemistry
 Histochemistry
 Hydrogenation
 Immunochemistry
 Inorganic chemistry
 Marine chemistry
 Mathematical chemistry
 Mechanochemistry
 Medicinal chemistry
 Molecular biology
 Molecular mechanics
 Nanotechnology
 Natural product chemistry
 Neurochemistry
 Oenology
 Organic chemistry (outline)
 Organometallic chemistry
 Petrochemistry
 Pharmacology
 Photochemistry
 Physical chemistry
 Physical organic chemistry
 Phytochemistry
 Polymer chemistry
 Quantum chemistry
 Radiochemistry
 Solid-state chemistry
 Sonochemistry
 Supramolecular chemistry
 Surface chemistry
 Synthetic chemistry
 Theoretical chemistry
 Thermochemistry

Earth science 

 Edaphology
 Environmental chemistry
 Environmental science
 Gemology
 Geochemistry
 Geodesy
 Physical geography (outline)
 Atmospheric science / Meteorology (outline)
 Biogeography / Phytogeography
 Climatology / Paleoclimatology / Palaeogeography
 Coastal geography / Oceanography
 Edaphology / Pedology or Soil science
 Geobiology
 Geology (outline) (Geomorphology, Mineralogy, Petrology, Sedimentology, Speleology, Tectonics, Volcanology)
 Geostatistics
 Glaciology
 Hydrology (outline)/ Limnology / Hydrogeology
 Landscape ecology
 Quaternary science
 Geophysics (outline)
 Paleontology
 Paleobiology
 Paleoecology

Astronomy 

 Astrobiology
 Observational astronomy
 Gamma ray astronomy
 Infrared astronomy
 Microwave astronomy
 Optical astronomy
 Radio astronomy
 UV astronomy
 X-ray astronomy
 Astrophysics
 Gravitational astronomy
 Black holes
 Cosmology
 Physical cosmology
 Interstellar medium
 Numerical simulations
 Astrophysical plasma
 Galaxy formation and evolution
 High-energy astrophysics
 Hydrodynamics
 Magnetohydrodynamics
 Star formation
 Stellar astrophysics
 Helioseismology
 Stellar evolution
 Stellar nucleosynthesis
 Planetary science

Physics 

 Acoustics
 Aerodynamics
 Applied physics
 Astrophysics
 Atomic, molecular, and optical physics
 Biophysics (outline)
 Computational physics
 Condensed matter physics
 Cryogenics
 Electricity
 Electromagnetism
 Elementary particle physics
 Experimental physics
 Fluid dynamics
 Geophysics (outline)
 Mathematical physics
 Mechanics
 Medical physics
 Molecular physics
 Newtonian dynamics
 Nuclear physics
 Optics
 Plasma physics
 Quantum physics
 Solid mechanics
 Solid state physics
 Statistical mechanics
 Theoretical physics
 Thermal physics
 Thermodynamics

Formal science

Computer science 

Also a branch of electrical engineering

 Logic in computer science
 Formal methods (Formal verification)
 Logic programming
 Multi-valued logic
 Fuzzy logic
 Programming language semantics
 Type theory
 Algorithms
 Computational geometry
 Distributed algorithms
 Parallel algorithms
 Randomized algorithms
 Artificial intelligence (outline)
 Cognitive science
 Automated reasoning
 Computer vision (outline)
 Machine learning
 Artificial neural networks
 Natural language processing (Computational linguistics)
 Expert systems
 Robotics (outline)
 Data structures
 Computer architecture
 Computer graphics
 Image processing
 Scientific visualization
 Computer communications (networks)
 Cloud computing
 Information theory
 Internet, World Wide Web
 Ubiquitous computing
 Wireless computing (Mobile computing)
 Computer security and reliability
 Cryptography
 Fault-tolerant computing
 Computing in mathematics, natural sciences, engineering, and medicine
 Algebraic (symbolic) computation
 Computational biology (bioinformatics)
 Computational chemistry
 Computational mathematics
 Computational neuroscience
 Computational number theory
 Computational physics
 Computer-aided engineering
 Computational fluid dynamics
 Finite element analysis
 Numerical analysis
 Scientific computing (Computational science)
 Computing in social sciences, arts, humanities, and professions
 Community informatics
 Computational economics
 Computational finance
 Computational sociology
 Digital humanities (Humanities computing)
 History of computer hardware
 History of computer science (outline)
 Humanistic informatics
 Databases (outline)
 Distributed databases
 Object databases
 Relational databases
 Data management
 Data mining
 Information architecture
 Information management
 Information retrieval
 Knowledge management
 Multimedia, hypermedia
 Sound and music computing
 Distributed computing
 Grid computing
 Human-computer interaction
 Operating systems
 Parallel computing
 High-performance computing
 Programming languages
 Compilers
 Programming paradigms
 Concurrent programming
 Functional programming
 Imperative programming
 Logic programming
 Object-oriented programming
 Program semantics
 Type theory
 Quantum computing
 Software engineering
 Formal methods (Formal verification)
 Theory of computation
 Automata theory (Formal languages)
 Computability theory
 Computational complexity theory
 Concurrency theory
 VLSI design

Mathematics 

Pure mathematics

 Mathematical logic and Foundations of mathematics
 Intuitionistic logic
 Modal logic
 Model theory
 Proof theory
 Recursion theory
 Set theory
 Arithmetic
 Algebra (outline)
 Associative algebra
 Category theory
 Topos theory
 Differential algebra
 Field theory
 Group theory
 Group representation
 Homological algebra
 K-theory
 Lattice theory (Order theory)
 Lie algebra
 Linear algebra (Vector space)
 Multilinear algebra
 Non-associative algebra
 Representation theory
 Ring theory
 Commutative algebra
 Noncommutative algebra
 Universal algebra
 Analysis
 Complex analysis
 Functional analysis
 Operator theory
 Harmonic analysis
 Fourier analysis
 Non-standard analysis
 Ordinary differential equations
 p-adic analysis
 Partial differential equations
 Real analysis
 Calculus (outline)
 Probability theory
 Ergodic theory
 Measure theory
 Integral geometry
 Stochastic process
 Geometry (outline) and Topology
 Affine geometry
 Algebraic geometry
 Algebraic topology
 Convex geometry
 Differential topology
 Discrete geometry
 Finite geometry
 Galois geometry
 General topology
 Geometric topology
 Integral geometry
 Noncommutative geometry
 Non-Euclidean geometry
 Projective geometry
 Number theory
 Algebraic number theory
 Analytic number theory
 Arithmetic combinatorics
 Geometric number theory
 

Applied mathematics

 Approximation theory
 Combinatorics (outline)
 Coding theory
 Cryptography
 Dynamical systems
 Chaos theory
 Fractal geometry
 Game theory
 Graph theory
 Information theory
 Mathematical physics
 Quantum field theory
 Quantum gravity
 String theory
 Quantum mechanics
 Statistical mechanics
 Numerical analysis
 Operations research
 Assignment problem
 Decision analysis
 Dynamic programming
 Inventory theory
 Linear programming
 Mathematical optimization
 Optimal maintenance
 Real options analysis
 Scheduling
 Stochastic processes
 Systems analysis
 Statistics (outline)
 Actuarial science
 Demography
 Econometrics
 Mathematical statistics
 Data visualization
 Theory of computation
 Computational complexity theory

Applied science

Agriculture 

 Aeroponics
 Agroecology
 Agrology
 Agronomy
 Animal husbandry (Animal science)
 Beekeeping (Apiculture)
 Anthroponics
 Agricultural economics
 Agricultural engineering
 Biological systems engineering
 Food engineering
 Aquaculture
 Aquaponics
 Enology
 Entomology
 Fogponics
 Food science
 Culinary arts
 Forestry
 Horticulture
 Hydrology (outline)
 Hydroponics
 Pedology
 Plant science (outline)
 Pomology
 Pest control
 Purification
 Viticulture

Architecture and design 

 Architecture (outline)
 Interior architecture
 Landscape architecture
 Architectural analytics
 Historic preservation
 Interior design (interior architecture)
 Landscape architecture (landscape planning)
 Landscape design
 Urban planning (urban design)
 Visual communication
 Graphic design
 Type design
 Technical drawing
 Industrial design (product design)
 Ergonomics (outline)
 Toy and amusement design
 User experience design
 Interaction design
 Information architecture
 User interface design
 User experience evaluation
 Decorative arts
 Fashion design
 Textile design

Business 

 Accounting
 Accounting research
 Accounting scholarship
 Business administration
 Business analysis
 Business ethics
 Business law
 Business management
 E-Business
 Entrepreneurship
 Finance (outline)
 Industrial and labor relations
 Collective bargaining
 Human resources
 Organizational studies
 Labor economics
 Labor history
 Information systems (Business informatics)
 Management information systems
 Health informatics
 Information technology (outline)
 International trade
 Management (outline)
 Marketing (outline)
 Operations management
 Purchasing
 Risk management and insurance
 Systems science

Divinity 

 Canon law
 Church history
 Field ministry
 Pastoral counseling
 Pastoral theology
 Religious education techniques
 Homiletics
 Liturgy
 Sacred music
 Missiology
 Hermeneutics
 Scriptural study and languages
 Biblical Hebrew
 Biblical studies/Sacred scripture
Vedic Study
 New Testament Greek
 Latin
 Old Church Slavonic
 Theology (outline)
 Dogmatic theology
 Ecclesiology
 Sacramental theology
 Systematic theology
 Christian ethics
Hindu ethics
 Moral theology
 Historical theology

Education 

 Comparative education
 Critical pedagogy
 Curriculum and instruction
 Alternative education
 Early childhood education
 Elementary education
 Secondary education
 Higher education
 Mastery learning
 Cooperative learning
 Agricultural education
 Art education
 Bilingual education
 Chemistry education
 Counselor education
 Language education
 Legal education
 Mathematics education
 Medical education
 Military education and training
 Music education
 Nursing education
 Outdoor education
 Peace education
 Physical education/Sports coaching
 Physics education
 Reading education
 Religious education
 Science education
 Special education
 Sex education
 Sociology of education
 Technology education
 Vocational education
 Educational leadership
 Educational philosophy
 Educational psychology
 Educational technology
 Distance education

Engineering and technology 

Chemical Engineering
 Bioengineering
 Biochemical engineering
 Biomolecular engineering
 Catalysis
 Materials engineering
 Molecular engineering
 Nanotechnology
 Polymer engineering
 Process design
 Petroleum engineering
 Nuclear engineering
 Food engineering
 Process engineering
 Reaction engineering
 Thermodynamics
 Transport phenomena

Civil Engineering
 Coastal engineering
 Earthquake engineering
 Ecological engineering
 Environmental engineering
 Geotechnical engineering
 Engineering geology
 Hydraulic engineering
 Mining engineering
 Transportation engineering
 Highway engineering
 Structural engineering
 Architectural engineering
 Structural mechanics
 Surveying

Educational Technology
 Instructional design
 Distance education
 Instructional simulation
 Human performance technology
 Knowledge management

Electrical Engineering
 Applied physics
 Computer engineering (outline)
 Computer science
 Control systems engineering
 Control theory
 Electronic engineering
 Instrumentation engineering
 Engineering physics
 Photonics
 Information theory
 Mechatronics
 Power engineering
 Quantum computing
 Robotics (outline)
 Semiconductors
 Telecommunications engineering

Materials Science and Engineering
 Biomaterials
 Ceramic engineering
 Crystallography
 Nanomaterials
 Photonics
 Physical Metallurgy
 Polymer engineering
 Polymer science
 Semiconductors

Mechanical Engineering
 Aerospace engineering
Aeronautics
Astronautics
 Acoustical engineering
 Automotive engineering
 Biomedical engineering
 Biomechanical engineering
 Neural engineering
 Continuum mechanics
 Fluid mechanics
 Heat transfer
 Industrial engineering
 Manufacturing engineering
 Marine engineering
 Mass transfer
 Mechatronics
 Nanoengineering
 Ocean engineering
 Optical engineering
 Robotics
 Thermodynamics

Systems science
 Chaos theory
 Complex systems
 Conceptual systems
 Control theory
 Affect control theory
 Control engineering
 Control systems
 Dynamical systems
 Perceptual control theory
 Cybernetics
 Biocybernetics
 Engineering cybernetics
 Management cybernetics
 Medical cybernetics
 New Cybernetics
 Second-order cybernetics
 Sociocybernetics
 Network science
 Operations research
 Systems biology
 Computational systems biology
 Synthetic biology
 Systems immunology
 Systems neuroscience
 System dynamics
 Social dynamics
 Systems ecology
 Ecosystem ecology
 Systems engineering
 Biological systems engineering
 Earth systems engineering and management
 Enterprise systems engineering
 Systems analysis
 Systems psychology
 Ergonomics
 Family systems theory
 Systemic therapy
 Systems theory
 Biochemical systems theory
 Ecological systems theory
 Developmental systems theory
 General systems theory
 Living systems theory
 LTI system theory
 Mathematical system theory
 Sociotechnical systems theory
 World-systems theory
 Systems theory in anthropology

Environmental studies and forestry 

 Environmental management
 Coastal management
 Fisheries management
 Land management
 Natural resource management
 Waste management
 Wildlife management
 Environmental policy
 Wildlife observation
 Recreation ecology
 Silviculture
 Sustainability studies
 Sustainable development
 Toxicology
 Ecology

Family and consumer science 

 Consumer education
 Housing
 Interior design
 Nutrition (outline)
 Foodservice management
 Textiles

Human physical performance and recreation 

 Biomechanics / Sports biomechanics
 Sports coaching
 Escapology
 Ergonomics
 Physical fitness
 Aerobics
 Personal trainer / Personal fitness training
 Game design
 Exercise physiology
 Kinesiology / Exercise physiology / Performance science
 Leisure studies
 Navigation
 Outdoor activity
 Physical activity
 Physical education / Pedagogy
 Sociology of sport
 Sexology
 Sports / exercise
 Sports journalism / sportscasting
 Sport management
 Athletic director
 Sport psychology
 Sports medicine
 Athletic training
 Survival skills
 Batoning
 Bushcraft
 Scoutcraft
 Woodcraft
 Toy and amusement design

Journalism, media studies and communication 

 Journalism (outline)
 Broadcast journalism
 Digital journalism
 Literary journalism
 New media journalism
 Print journalism
 Sports journalism / sportscasting
 Media studies (Mass media)
 Newspaper
 Magazine
 Radio (outline)
 Television (outline)
 Television studies
 Film (outline)
 Film studies
 Game studies
 Fan studies
 Narratology
 Internet (outline)
 Communication studies
 Advertising
 Animal communication
 Communication design
 Conspiracy theory
 Digital media
 Electronic media
 Environmental communication
 Hoax
 Information theory
 Intercultural communication
 Marketing (outline)
 Mass communication
 Nonverbal communication
 Organizational communication
 Popular culture studies
 Propaganda
 Public relations (outline)
 Speech communication
 Technical writing
 Translation

Law 

 Legal management (academic discipline)
 Corporate law
 Mercantile law
 Business law
 Administrative law
 Canon law
 Comparative law
 Constitutional law
 Competition law
 Criminal law
 Criminal procedure
 Criminal justice (outline)
 Police science
 Forensic science (outline)
 Islamic law
 Jewish law (outline)
 Jurisprudence (Philosophy of Law)
 Civil law
 Admiralty law
 Animal law/Animal rights
 Common law
 Corporations
 Civil procedure
 Contract law
 Environmental law
 Family law
 Federal law
 International law
 Public international law
 Supranational law
 Labor law
 Paralegal studies
 Property law
 Tax law
 Tort law (outline)
 Law enforcement (outline)
 Procedural law
 Substantive law

Library and museum studies 

 Archival science
 Archivist
 Bibliographic databases
 Bibliometrics
 Bookmobile
 Cataloging
 Citation analysis
 Categorization
 Classification
 Library classification
 Taxonomic classification
 Scientific classification
 Statistical classification
 Security classification
 Film classification
 Collections care
 Collection management
 Collection Management Policy
 Conservation science
 Conservation and restoration of cultural heritage
 Curator
 Data storage
 Database management
 Data modeling
 Digital preservation
 Dissemination
 Film preservation
 Five laws of library science
 Historic preservation
 History of library science
 Human-computer interaction
 Indexer
 Informatics
 Information architecture
 Information broker
 Information literacy
 Information retrieval
 Information science (outline)
 Information systems and technology
 Integrated library system
 Interlibrary loan
 Knowledge engineering
 Knowledge management
 Library
 Library binding
 Library circulation
 Library instruction
 Library portal
 Library technical services
 Management
 Mass deacidification
 Museology
 Museum education
 Museum administration
 Object conservation
 Preservation
 Prospect research
 Readers' advisory
 Records management
 Reference
 Reference desk
 Reference management software
 Registrar
 Research methods
 Slow fire
 Special library
 Statistics

Medicine and health 

 Alternative medicine
 Audiology
 Clinical laboratory sciences/Clinical pathology/Laboratory medicine
 Clinical biochemistry
 Cytogenetics
 Cytohematology
 Cytology (outline)
 Haemostasiology
 Histology
 Clinical immunology
 Clinical microbiology
 Molecular genetics
 Parasitology
 Clinical physiology
 Dentistry (outline)
 Dental hygiene and epidemiology
 Dental surgery
 Endodontics
 Implantology
 Oral and maxillofacial surgery
 Orthodontics
 Periodontics
 Prosthodontics
 Dermatology
 Emergency medicine (outline)
 Epidemiology
 Geriatrics
 Gynaecology
 Health informatics/Clinical informatics
 Hematology
 Holistic medicine
 Infectious disease
 Intensive care medicine
 Internal medicine
 Cardiology
 Cardiac electrophysiology
 Endocrinology
 Gastroenterology
 Hepatology
 Nephrology
 Neurology
 Oncology
 Pulmonology
 Rheumatology
 Medical toxicology
 Music therapy
 Nursing
 Nutrition (outline) and dietetics
 Obstetrics (outline)
 Occupational hygiene
 Occupational therapy
 Occupational toxicology
 Ophthalmology
 Neuro-ophthalmology
 Optometry
 Otolaryngology
 Pathology
 Pediatrics
 Pharmaceutical sciences
 Pharmaceutical chemistry
 Pharmaceutical toxicology
 Pharmaceutics
 Pharmacocybernetics
 Pharmacodynamics
 Pharmacogenomics
 Pharmacognosy
 Pharmacokinetics
 Pharmacology
 Pharmacy
 Physical fitness
 Group Fitness / aerobics
 Kinesiology / Exercise science / Human performance
 Personal fitness training
 Physical therapy
 Physiotherapy
 Podiatry
 Preventive medicine
 Primary care
 General practice
 Psychiatry (outline)
 Forensic psychiatry
 Psychology (outline)
 Public health
 Radiology
 Recreational therapy
 Rehabilitation medicine
 Respiratory therapy
 Sleep medicine
 Speech–language pathology
 Sports medicine
 Surgery
 Bariatric surgery
 Cardiothoracic surgery
 Neurosurgery
 Orthoptics
 Orthopedic surgery
 Plastic surgery
 Trauma surgery
 Traumatology
 Traditional medicine
 Urology
 Andrology
 Veterinary medicine

Military sciences 

 Amphibious warfare
 Artillery
 Battlespace
 Air
 Information
 Land
 Sea
 Space
 Campaigning
 Military engineering
 Doctrine
 Espionage
 Game theory
Grand strategy
 Containment
Limited war
 Military science (outline)
 Philosophy of war
 Strategic studies
 Total war
 War (outline)
 Leadership
 Logistics
 Materiel
 Supply chain management
 Military operation
 Military history
 Prehistoric
 Ancient
 Medieval
 Early modern
 Industrial
 Modern
 Fourth-generation warfare
 Military intelligence
 Military law
 Military medicine
 Naval science
 Naval engineering
 Naval tactics
 Naval architecture
Organization
 Command and control
 Doctrine
 Education and training
 Engineers
 Intelligence
 Ranks
 Staff
 Technology and equipment
 Military exercises
 Military simulation
 Military sports
 Strategy
 Attrition
 Deception
 Defensive
 Offensive
 Counter-offensive
 Maneuver
 Goal
 Naval
 Tactics
 Aerial
 Battle
 Cavalry
 Charge
 Counter-attack
 Counter-insurgency
 Counter-intelligence
 Counter-terrorism
 Foxhole
 Endemic warfare
 Guerrilla warfare
 Infiltration
 Irregular warfare
 Morale
 Naval tactics
 Siege
 Surgical strike
 Tactical objective
 Trench warfare
 Military weapons
 Armor
 Artillery
 Biological
 Cavalry
 Conventional
 Chemical
 Cyber
 Economic
 Electronic
 Infantry
 Nuclear
 Psychological
 Unconventional
 Other Military
 Arms control
 Arms race
 Assassination
 Asymmetric warfare
 Civil defense
 Clandestine operation
 Collateral damage
 Cold war (general term)
 Combat
 Covert operation
 Cyberwarfare
 Defense industry
 Disarmament
 Intelligence agency
 Laws of war
 Mercenary
 Military campaign
 Military operation
 Mock combat
 Network-centric warfare
 Paramilitary
 Principles of war
 Private defense agency
 Private military company
 Proxy war
 Religious war
 Security
 Special forces
 Special operations
 Theater (warfare)
 Theft
 Undercover
 War crimes
 Warrior

Public administration 

 Civil service
 Corrections
 Conservation biology
 Criminal justice (outline)
 Disaster research
 Disaster response
 Emergency management
 Emergency services
 Fire safety (Structural fire protection)
 Fire ecology (Wildland fire management)
 Governmental affairs
 International affairs
 Law enforcement
 Peace and conflict studies
 Police science
 Policy studies
 Policy analysis
 Public administration
 Nonprofit administration
 Non-governmental organization (NGO) administration
 Public policy doctrine
 Public policy school
 Regulation
 Public safety
 Public service

Public policy 

 Agricultural policy
 Commercial policy
 Cultural policy
 Domestic policy
 Drug policy
 Drug policy reform
 Economic policy
 Fiscal policy
 Incomes policy
 Industrial policy
 Investment policy
 Monetary policy
 Tax policy
 Education policy
 Energy policy
 Nuclear energy policy
 Renewable energy policy
 Environmental policy
 Food policy
 Foreign policy
 Health policy
 Pharmaceutical policy
 Vaccination policy
 Housing policy
 Immigration policy
 Knowledge policy
 Language policy
 Military policy
 Science policy
 Climate change policy
 Stem cell research policy
 Space policy
 Technology policy
 Security policy
 Social policy
 Public policy by country

Social work 

 Child welfare
 Community practice
 Community organizing
 Social policy
 Human Services
 Corrections
 Gerontology
 Medical social work
 Mental health
 School social work

Transportation 

 Highway safety
 Infographics
 Intermodal transportation studies
 Logistics
 Marine transportation
 Port management
 Seafaring
 Operations research
 Mass transit
 Travel
 Vehicles

See also 

 Academia (outline)
 Academic genealogy
 Curriculum
 Interdisciplinarity
 Transdisciplinarity
 Professions
 Classification of Instructional Programs
 Joint Academic Coding System
 List of fields of doctoral studies in the United States
 List of academic fields
 International Academic Association for the Enhancement of Learning in Higher Education

References

Further reading
 
 
 US Department of Education Institute of Education Sciences. Classification of Instructional Programs (CIP). National Center for Education Statistics.

External links 
 Classification of Instructional Programs (CIP 2000): Developed by the U.S. Department of Education's National Center for Education Statistics to provide a taxonomic scheme that will support the accurate tracking, assessment, and reporting of fields of study and program completions activity.
 Complete JACS (Joint Academic Classification of Subjects) from Higher Education Statistics Agency (HESA) in the United Kingdom
 Australian and New Zealand Standard Research Classification (ANZSRC 2008) (web-page ) Chapter 3 and Appendix 1: Fields of research classification.
 Fields of Knowledge, a zoomable map allowing the academic disciplines and sub-disciplines in this article be visualised.
 Sandoz, R. (ed.), Interactive Historical Atlas of the Disciplines, University of Geneva

academic disciplines
academic disciplines
Academic disciplines
Educational classification systems
Education-related lists
Science-related lists
Higher education-related lists